L. grandis may refer to:
 Lasius grandis, an ant species in the genus Lasius
 Lethocerus grandis, a giant water bug species in the genus Lethocerus
 Licuala grandis, the ruffled fan palm, Vanuatu fan palm or Palas palm, a palm tree species  native to Vanuatu
 Liocypris grandis, an ostracod species found in the Western Cape of South Africa
 Lonchura grandis, the grand munia, a finch species found in West Papua, Indonesia and Papua New Guinea
 Liphyra grandis, a butterfly species in the genus Liphyra endemic to New Guinea

Synonyms
 Loncheres grandis, a synonym for Toromys grandis, the giant tree rat or white-faced tree rat, a spiny rat species found in Brazil

See also
 Grandis (disambiguation)